Diaphania lucidalis is a moth in the family Crambidae. It was described by Jacob Hübner in 1823. It is found in Panama, Grenada, Cuba, Jamaica, Venezuela, Ecuador, Brazil, Bolivia and Paraguay.

The length of the forewings is 13–15 mm for males and 13–16 mm for females. The costal and external bands on the forewings are brown. The white area of the wing has a purple gloss. The hindwings have a brown band and a translucent white area with a purple gloss.

References

Moths described in 1823
Diaphania